

Baia is a commune in Tulcea County, Northern Dobruja, Romania.

Villages
The commune includes five villages:
 Baia (Hamangia until 1929)
 Camena
 Caugagia
 Ceamurlia de Sus (Yeni Kazak until ca. 1855)
 Panduru (Potur until 1929)

History 

In 1953, archaeological excavations on a site along the Lake Golovița, near Baia, led to the discovery of a new Middle Neolithic culture, named after the commune. Further research has shown that the culture, with Mediterranean origins, extended across Dobruja and North-Eastern Bulgaria. The culture's most notable artefact is an anthropomorphic statuette in terra cotta, known as The Thinker, which was discovered at Cernavodă.

References 

Communes in Tulcea County
Localities in Northern Dobruja
Aromanian settlements in Romania